Fay Presto (born: 17 May 1948) is the stage name of Letitia Winter, a British magician and member of The Inner Magic Circle known for her close-up magic.

Career
Presto's first job was as a lab assistant at an atomic energy research company, and she tried returning to study and working in sales before developing an interest in performing magic in her late thirties. She joined The Magic Circle, but was asked to leave when she began to transition. When The Magic Circle voted to allow women members in 1991, she was one of the first women to join.

Presto specialises in close-up magic, and had held a residency at London's Langan's Brasserie since the start of her magic career. She is known for her "bottle through the table" trick, which was ranked as the 37th greatest magic trick of all time by Channel 4's 50 Greatest Magic Tricks.

Fay was part of the UK touring show Champions of Magic from 2014 to 2017, alongside fellow magicians Edward Hilsum, Alex McLear and Young & Strange.

She was profiled in the BBC documentary series 40 Minutes in 1994 in the episode "Fay Presto: Illusions of Grandeur" directed by Sally George. In 2017, Presto was the subject of the documentary Fay Presto, the Queen of Close-up.

Television appearances

Presto has appeared in a number of documentaries and played herself in cameo roles.

Awards and accolades

In 1998 Presto was voted "Party Entertainer of the Year" by Tatler Magazine.

In 2012 Presto won the title of The Magic Circle Close-up Magician of the Year 2012.

Personal life and charity work

Presto is a transgender woman, and regularly organises and performs in benefits to support the rights of women, children and the LGBT community. She is an ambassador for Action for Children.

References

External links
Fay Presto official website
The Magic Circle

Fay Presto, Queen of Close-up film website

1948 births
Living people
British magicians
Female magicians
LGBT magicians
Transgender entertainers
Transgender women